Pehria is a genus of moths in the family Lasiocampidae. The genus was erected by Embrik Strand in 1910.

Species 
Pehria electrophaea Tams 1929
Pehria strandi Tams 1929
Pehria umbrina Aurivillius, 1909 (from Congo (Kouilou)

References

Lasiocampinae